BR Nagaraja Rao (1914 – 3 April 2004) was an Indian cricketer and umpire. He stood in two ODI games between 1985 and 1986.

See also
 List of One Day International cricket umpires

References

External links

1914 births
2004 deaths
Indian One Day International cricket umpires
People from Shimoga
Indian cricketers
Karnataka cricketers
Cricketers from Karnataka